Inish Turk Beg is a private island in Clew Bay, County Mayo on the west coast of Ireland. Between 2003 and 2013, it was owned by Nadim Sadek, an Irish-Egyptian marketing entrepreneur.

Geography
Inish Turk Beg is one of the largest islands in Clew Bay. The holy mountain of Croagh Patrick stands to the south of the bay.  To the north is the Nephin Beg mountain range. In the east are the County Mayo towns of Newport and Westport. To the west is Clare Island: the largest island in Clew Bay.

History
On the west coast of Ireland, islands are often known by what could once be found on them (Inishbofin, for example, is "island of the white cow"). Historically the island's economy has been based on agriculture and the cultivation of livestock such as sheep, pigs, cattle, and potatoes. The raised potato rill (or drill) gives the land around Inish Turk Beg's landscape a recognisable "rippled" appearance. Inish Turk Beg was also once host to a number of boat-builders.

In 2003, the island was purchased by Nadim Sadek. Over the next decade, the entrepreneur invested in infrastructure including roads, jetties, sewage systems and utility buildings. He also used the island to launch a variety of business ventures including hospitality, smoked fish range, music recording, a Connemara Pony Stud, art residencies and a malt whiskey. In 2013, Sadek sold the island for €4,000,000 but kept the intellectual property rights to the business he established.

References

External links
Photos of Inish Turb Beg

Islands of County Mayo
Private islands of Ireland